Miguel Ángel Ferrer Martínez (born 12 November 1978), known as Mista, is a Spanish former professional footballer who played as a striker, currently a manager.

An unsuccessful Real Madrid youth graduate, he would make a name for himself with Valencia, helping the club win a total of four major titles during a five-year spell and scoring a total of 48 goals in 218 La Liga games over ten seasons, in representation of four teams.

Club career

Spain
Born in Caravaca de la Cruz, Region of Murcia, Mista was a protégé of Rafael Benítez, who first coached him at Real Madrid Castilla. He also worked with the player at CD Tenerife, and then Valencia CF.

At Tenerife, Mista – along with Curro Torres and Luis García – was a key member of the team that won promotion to La Liga in 2001. He subsequently signed for Valencia, and was a prominent member of the successful sides that won two league titles and the 2004 UEFA Cup, where he scored the second goal in the 2–0 win against Olympique de Marseille. On 21 March 2004 he netted a hat-trick for the eventual champions in a 5–1 home victory over RCD Mallorca, but his goal rate decreased drastically after the 2004–05 campaign.

In July 2006, Mista joined Atlético Madrid, playing 29 games in his first season but almost absolutely no part in the following. In July 2008, the free agent moved to fellow league club Deportivo de La Coruña on a three-year contract, scoring in his competitive debut by netting the first in a 2–1 defeat of Real Madrid on 31 August; constantly troubled by injuries and a loss of form, his second league goal came more than a year later (7 November 2009) in a 2–0 away victory against Getafe CF.

Toronto FC
After only two official goals for Deportivo in two seasons, Mista signed with Toronto FC of Major League Soccer on 6 July 2010, in a deal running until the end of the campaign. He made his unofficial debut for the team in a friendly against Bolton Wanderers at BMO Field on the 21st, and first appeared in the league in a home match against FC Dallas on 24 July. His first and only goal came on 17 August, in a 2–1 home win over Cruz Azul in the CONCACAF Champions League.

On 24 November 2010, in the 2010 MLS Expansion Draft, 32-year-old Mista was waived following a poor season with Toronto. He announced his retirement on 14 August of the following year.

International career
Mista made his debut with Spain on 26 March 2005, in a 3–0 friendly win against China in Salamanca. He added another cap seven months later, in a 6–0 away thrashing of San Marino for the 2006 FIFA World Cup qualifiers.

Coaching career
Mista began working as a coach at youth level, first with Valencia then with Madrid-based Rayo Vallecano. On 11 February 2020, he was announced as the first manager of Canadian Premier League side Atlético Ottawa at the club's official launch event. After the COVID-19 pandemic, he finally made his managerial debut on 15 August in a 2–2 draw with York9 FC in neutral Prince Edward Island; the team from the capital finished the season in seventh place, one above last. 

After a last-place finish in the 2021 campaign, Mista announced that he would not be returning.

Managerial statistics

Honours
Valencia
La Liga: 2001–02, 2003–04
UEFA Cup: 2003–04
UEFA Super Cup: 2004

Atlético Madrid
UEFA Intertoto Cup: 2007

Deportivo
UEFA Intertoto Cup: 2008

Toronto
Canadian Championship: 2010

References

External links

1978 births
Living people
People from Caravaca de la Cruz
Spanish footballers
Footballers from the Region of Murcia
Association football forwards
La Liga players
Segunda División players
Segunda División B players
Real Madrid C footballers
Real Madrid Castilla footballers
CD Tenerife players
Valencia CF players
Atlético Madrid footballers
Deportivo de La Coruña players
Major League Soccer players
Designated Players (MLS)
Toronto FC players
UEFA Cup winning players
Spain youth international footballers
Spain under-21 international footballers
Spain international footballers
Spanish expatriate footballers
Expatriate soccer players in Canada
Spanish expatriate sportspeople in Canada
Spanish football managers
Canadian Premier League coaches
Spanish expatriate football managers
Expatriate soccer managers in Canada
Atlético Ottawa non-playing staff